The Peña Joker and Super Joker are a family of French amateur-built aircraft that were designed by Louis Peña of Dax, Landes and are made available in the form of plans for amateur construction.

Design and development
The Joker is intended as a training aircraft. It features a cantilever low-wing, a two-seats-in-side-by-side configuration enclosed cockpit under a bubble canopy, fixed tricycle landing gear and a single engine in tractor configuration.

As the designer is a competitive aerobatic pilot, the Joker retains the capability of doing basic aerobatics and features a fast roll rate.

Variants
Joker
Two seat model powered by  engines
Super Joker
Three seat model powered by a  engine

Specifications (Joker)

References

External links

Homebuilt aircraft
Single-engined tractor aircraft
Aerobatic aircraft